The Paternity and Adoption Leave Regulations 2002 (SI 2002/2788) are a statutory instrument concerning UK labour law. They confer on fathers a bare right to two weeks leave, paid at £140.98 in 2017, for the purpose of looking after children.

Contents
The Paternity and Adoption Leave Regulations 2002 regulations 5-14 concern paternity rights, regulations 16-27 concern adoption, and 28-31 contain provisions which apply to both kinds of leave.

r 4 expected date of birth;
r 5 leave must be taken between the date of birth and 56 days later
r 6 up to two consecutive weeks leave for paternity at the low rate of maternity pay
r 8 paternity leave must be taken for the purposes of caring for a child or supporting the child’s mother or adopter
r 10 notice requirements for paternity
r 12 contract subsists
r 13 right to return to the same job after a period of leave, so long as no more than 4 weeks parental leave has been taken as well
r 14 same seniority, pensions and other rights as if not absent
rr 15-20 period of adoption leave equivalent to maternity for the primary carer of the child
r 17 notice before the expected date of placement
r 20 provision for non-placement or death of a child
r 28, no detriment for wanting to take or taking paternity or adoption leave, as under ERA 1996 s 47C
r 29, under ERA 1996 s 99, employee will be regarded as unfairly dismissed if the principal reason was about paternity or adoption leave.
r 30, one has to choose between paternity leave and adoption leave, but cannot choose both.
r 31, pay is calculated as the average amount in the 12 weeks before the leave.

See also

Child care in the United Kingdom
Tax Credits and Child tax credit, Working tax credit

Notes

References

External links

United Kingdom labour law
2002 in British law
Statutory Instruments of the United Kingdom
Adoption in the United Kingdom
Parental leave in the United Kingdom
2002 in labor relations
Paternity in the United Kingdom